Ptolemais Hermiou, or Ptolemais in the Thebaid, was a city and metropolitan archbishopric in Greco-Roman Egypt and remains a Catholic titular see.

Today, the city of El Mansha-Bsoi in the Sohag Governorate is located where the ancient city used to be.

History 
Ptolemais Hermiou was established on the west bank of the Nile at the site of the Egyptian village of Psoï ( in the Thinis nome by the Ptolemaic ruler Ptolemy I Soter sometime after 312 BCE to be the capital of Upper Egypt.

According to Strabo, it was the largest city in the Thebaid, equal to Memphis in size. It also had its own constitution, an assembly with elected magistrates and judges not unlike a traditional Greek polis. Greek settlers to the city were brought over from the Peloponnese and northern Greece. The city housed temples to Greek and Egyptian gods (Zeus, Dionysus, Isis) as well as a cult for the worship of the Ptolemaic Dynasty. There was also a theater and actor's guild present in the city.

Titular see 
The provincial capital and hence Metropolitan archdiocese of the Late Roman province of Thebais Secunda, which had faded, was nominally restored as a Latin Metropolitan titular archbishopric in the late 19th century as Ptolemais antea Syis, renamed simply Ptolemais in 1925, Ptolemais in Thebaide in 1933.

It has been vacant for decades, having had the following incumbents of the highest rank :
 Lorenzo Passerini (1892.07.11 – 1901.04.18), later Titular Latin Patriarch of Antioch (1901.04.18 – 1915.12.13)
 Luigi Canali, Franciscans (O.F.M. Obs.) (1901.08.03 – 1905.04.22)
 José Marcondes Homem de Melo (1906.12.06 – 1908.08.09)
 Raffaele Virili (1915.01.14 – 1925.03.09)
 Paolo Giobbe (1925.03.30 – 1958.12.15) (later Cardinal)
 Pietro Parente (1959.10.23 – 1965.12.07) (later Cardinal)

References

External links 
 GCatholic, with titular incumbent bio links

Ptolemaic colonies
Populated places in Sohag Governorate
Former populated places in Egypt
Upper Egypt